In set theory and its applications to logic, mathematics, and computer science, set-builder notation is a mathematical notation for describing a set by enumerating its elements, or stating the properties that its members must satisfy.

Defining sets by properties is also known as set comprehension, set abstraction or as defining a set's intension.

Sets defined by enumeration 

A set can be described directly by enumerating all of its elements between curly brackets, as in the following two examples:

  is the set containing the four numbers 3, 7, 15, and 31, and nothing else.

This is sometimes called the "roster method" for specifying a set.

When it is desired to denote a set that contains elements from a regular sequence, an ellipsis notation may be employed, as shown in the next examples:

  is the set of integers between 1 and 100 inclusive.
  is the set of natural numbers.
  is the set of all integers.

There is no order among the elements of a set (this explains and validates the equality of the last example), but with the ellipses notation, we use an ordered sequence before (or after) the ellipsis as a convenient notational vehicle for explaining which elements are in a set. The first few elements of the sequence are shown, then the ellipses indicate that the simplest interpretation should be applied for continuing the sequence. Should no terminating value appear to the right of the ellipses, then the sequence is considered to be unbounded.

In general,  denotes the set of all natural numbers  such that .

In each preceding example, each set is described by enumerating its elements. Not all sets can be described in this way, or if they can, their enumeration may be too long or too complicated to be useful. Therefore, many sets are defined by a property that characterizes their elements. This characterization may be done informally using general prose, as in the following example.

  addresses on Pine Street  is the set of all addresses on Pine Street.

However, the prose approach may lack accuracy or be ambiguous. Thus, set-builder notation is often used with a predicate characterizing the elements of the set being defined, as described in the following section.

Sets defined by a predicate 
Set-builder notation can be used to describe a set that is defined by a predicate, that is, a logical formula that evaluates to true for an element of the set, and false otherwise. In this form, set-builder notation has three parts: a variable, a colon or vertical bar separator, and a predicate. Thus there is a variable on the left of the separator, and a rule on the right of it. These three parts are contained in curly brackets:

or

The vertical bar (or colon) is a separator that can be read as "such that",  "for which", or "with the property that". The formula  is said to be the rule or the predicate. Thus  is the set of all values of  that satisfy the formula . It may be the empty set, if no value of  satisfies the formula.

Specifying the domain 

A domain  can appear on the left of the vertical bar: 
 
or by adjoining it to the predicate:
 
The ∈ symbol here denotes set membership, while the  symbol denotes the logical "and" operator, known as logical conjunction. This notation represents the set of all values of  that belong to some given set  for which the predicate is true (see "Set existence axiom" below). If  is a conjunction , then  is sometimes written , using a comma instead of the symbol .

In general, it is not a good idea to consider sets without defining a domain of discourse, as this would represent the subset of all possible things that may exist for which the predicate is true. This can easily lead to contradictions and paradoxes. For example, Russell's paradox shows that the expression  although seemingly well formed as a set builder expression, cannot define a set without producing a contradiction.

In cases where the set  is clear from context, it may be not explicitly specified. It is common in the literature for an author to state the domain ahead of time, and then not specify it in the set-builder notation. For example, an author may say something such as, "Unless otherwise stated, variables are to be taken to be natural numbers," though in less formal contexts where the domain can be assumed, a written mention is often unnecessary.

Examples 
The following examples illustrate particular sets defined by set-builder notation via predicates. In each case, the domain is specified on the left side of the vertical bar, while the rule is specified on the right side. 

  is the set .
 For each integer , we can define .

Here the cartesian product  denotes the set of ordered pairs of real numbers. 

  is the set of all even natural numbers. The  sign stands for "and", which is known as logical conjunction. The ∃ sign stands for "there exists", which is known as existential quantification. So for example,  is read as  "there exists an  such that ".

   is a notational variant for the same set of even natural numbers. It is not necessary to specify that  is a natural number, as this is implied by the formula on the right.

  is the set of rational numbers; that is, real numbers that can be written as the ratio of two integers.

More complex expressions on the left side of the notation 

An extension of set-builder notation replaces the single variable  with an expression.
.

For example:

 , where  is the set of all natural numbers, is the set of all even natural numbers.
 , where  is the set of all integers, is  the set of all rational numbers.
  is the set of odd integers.
   creates a set of pairs, where each pair puts an integer into correspondence with an odd integer.

When inverse functions can be explicitly stated, the expression on the left can be eliminated through simple substitution. Consider the example set . Make the substitution , which is to say , then replace t in the set builder notation to find

Equivalent predicates yield equal sets 

Two sets are equal if and only if they have the same elements. Sets defined by set builder notation are equal if and only if their set builder rules, including the domain specifiers, are equivalent. That is 
 
if and only if 
.
Therefore, in order to prove the equality of two sets defined by set builder notation, it suffices to prove the equivalence of their predicates, including the domain qualifiers.

For example,

because the two rule predicates are logically equivalent:

In particular, both sets are equal to the set .

Set existence axiom 
In many formal set theories, such as Zermelo–Fraenkel set theory, set builder notation is not part of the formal syntax of the theory.

In programming languages 

A similar notation available in a number of programming languages (notably Python and Haskell) is the list comprehension, which combines map and filter operations over one or more lists.

In Python, the set-builder's braces are replaced with square brackets, parentheses, or curly braces, giving list, generator, and set objects, respectively. Python uses an English-based syntax. Haskell replaces the set-builder's braces with square brackets and uses symbols, including the standard set-builder vertical bar.

The same can be achieved in Scala using Sequence Comprehensions, where the "for" keyword returns a list of the yielded variables using the "yield" keyword.

Consider these set-builder notation examples in some programming languages:

The set builder notation and list comprehension notation are both instances of a more general notation known as monad comprehensions, which permits map/filter-like operations over any monad with a zero element.

See also 
 Glossary of set theory

Notes 

Set theory
Mathematical notation
Articles with example Haskell code
Articles with example Python (programming language) code

is:Mengjaskilgreiningarritháttur